Biscayneer was a cutter launched in 1779. From at least 1781 on she was a privateer based in Dartmouth, Devon. She captured or recaptured several vessels before her owner-captain sold her in 1783 after the end of the American War of Independence. New owners renamed her Retreat. She was last listed in 1784.

Career
Biscyneir first appeared in Lloyd's Register (LR) in 1782.

Captain William Croute had acquired a letter of marque on 17 April 1781. Biscayneers owner was listed as Robert Newman & Co. This was a letter of marque against France. He had earlier acquired letters of marque against the United States, Spain, and Holland.

Lloyd's List reported in June 1781 that the Dartmouth privateer Biscayneer, Crowte, master, had taken and sent into Dartmouth a French brig carrying a cargo of wine, brandy and bale goods. Prize money was awarded on 6 December 1781 for the French vessel Valiant.

A year or so later, in July 1782, Lloyd's List reported that the privateer Biscayneer had recaptured , Ray, master, one of the Newfoundland fleet, and brought her into Dartmouth. Biscayneer would have been entitled to salvage for the recapture.

Later in July, Biscayneer, Crowte, master, captured and sent into Dartmouth Modeste, which had been sailing from Ferrol in ballast. The Spanish-built snow of 70 tons (bm), was sold on 19 August.

Fate
Retreat was last listed in 1784.

Note

Citations

References
 

1779 ships
Age of Sail merchant ships of England
Privateer ships of Great Britain